Héctor Barberá Vall (born November 2, 1986) is a Spanish Grand Prix motorcycle road racer. He competes in MotoAmerica aboard a BMW S1000RR.

Career
Born in Dos Aguas, Valencia Province, Barberá began his World Championship career at the age of 15 in the  125cc world championship, under the guidance of Jorge Martínez "Aspar", who teamed Barberá and fellow youngster Ángel Rodríguez up with the experienced Pablo Nieto.

In his first season Barberá established himself as the most promising rider of the three and in  he broke through, with his first victory at Donington Park making him one of the youngest riders ever to win a Grand Prix.

Barberá survived a huge crash during the Italian round of the championship on June 1, . Running second behind Marco Simoncelli on the penultimate lap who tried to defend his lead by changing his line on the straight, Barberá slipstreamed onto Simoncelli's back wheel and clipped it with his front brake lever. His bike somersaulted through the air, with Barberá escaping somewhat uninjured. However, a further crash in practice at Motegi left him with two spinal fractures, ending his season.

In the  250cc world championship, Barberá won three races along with five other podium results to finish second to Honda's Hiroshi Aoyama. Barberá finished the 2010 MotoGP season in twelfth place, and followed on in eleventh place in 2011. On 7 November 2011, it was announced that he was moving to Pramac Racing for the 2012 season.

Career statistics

Grand Prix motorcycle racing

By season

By class

Races by year
(key) (Races in bold indicate pole position, races in italics indicate fastest lap)

Supersport World Championship

Races by year
(key) (Races in bold indicate pole position, races in italics indicate fastest lap)

Superbike World Championship

Races by year
(key) (Races in bold indicate pole position, races in italics indicate fastest lap)

AMA Superbike Championship

Races by year

British Superbike Championship

By year

References

External links

 Team Aspar web site
 Héctor Barberá Profile at Eurosport Yahoo!

1986 births
Living people
Sportspeople from the Province of Valencia
Spanish motorcycle racers
125cc World Championship riders
250cc World Championship riders
Ducati Corse MotoGP riders
Avintia Racing MotoGP riders
Pramac Racing MotoGP riders
Aspar Racing Team MotoGP riders
Moto2 World Championship riders
Supersport World Championship riders
MotoGP World Championship riders
Superbike World Championship riders
British Superbike Championship riders